The Asgat mine is one of the largest silver mines in Mongolia and in the world.
Asgat Mine sits on the Yustid Ore Cluster  in Nogoonnuur District, Bayan-Ölgii Province The mine has estimated reserves of 2,247 tons silver. In addition, the mine is estimated to contain 4,229 tons of Arsenic, 2,092 tons of Zinc, and 8.9 tons of cadmium among other deposits.
The mine is not currently in operation. Part of the mine required for access sits across the border in Russia, the location lacks road, rail, water, and power infrastructure.

References 

Silver mines in Mongolia